Hugh Despenser (c. 1337/8 – 2 March 1374) was an English soldier and knight.

Biography
Hugh was the second son of Edward Despenser and Anne Ferrers.

While with an English force in northwest France in 1370 and was captured during an action.  He died on 2 March 1374 at Padua, Veneto, Italy.

Marriage and issue
Hugh married Alice, daughter of  John Hotham, they had the following issue.
Hugh Despenser (died 1401), without issue.
Anne Despenser, married Edward le Boteler, had issue.

Citations

References

Year of birth unknown
1374 deaths
14th-century English people
English soldiers
14th-century military history of the Kingdom of England
Place of birth missing